Neđeljko Vlahović (Cyrillic: Heдeљкo Bлaxoвић, born 15 January 1984) is a Montenegrin football midfielder, who plays with FK Kom Podgorica in the Montenegrin Second League.

Club career
Born in Montenegrin capital Podgorica, he played with FK Kom, FK Zora and FK Budućnost Podgorica before joining FK Rudar Pljevlja and playing with them as captain 7 consecutive seasons in the Montenegrin First League. After making 5 appearances with Rudar in the 2016–17 Montenegrin First League, in the last day of the summer transfers window, he left Rudar and moved for first time abroad in his career, by joining Serbian SUperLiga side FK Radnik Surdulica.

On 15 February 2019, Vlahović returned to FK Kom Podgorica.

International career
Vlahović has made one appearance for the Montenegro national football team, an August 2007 friendly match against Slovenia in which he came on as a late substitute for Branko Bošković.

Honours
Rudar Pljevlja
Montenegrin First League: 2009–10, 2014–15
Montenegrin Cup: 2010, 2011, 2016

References

1984 births
Living people
Footballers from Podgorica
Association football midfielders
Serbia and Montenegro footballers
Montenegrin footballers
Montenegro international footballers
FK Kom players
FK Zora players
FK Budućnost Podgorica players
FK Rudar Pljevlja players
FK Radnik Surdulica players
OFK Titograd players
OFK Grbalj players
First League of Serbia and Montenegro players
Second League of Serbia and Montenegro players
Montenegrin First League players
Serbian SuperLiga players
Montenegrin Second League players
Montenegrin expatriate footballers
Expatriate footballers in Serbia
Montenegrin expatriate sportspeople in Serbia